The Co-operative Bank is based and registered in New Zealand. It provides everyday banking, deposits, savings, loans, insurance and small-business banking throughout the country. 

Originally set up in 1928 as the Public Service Investment Society and subsequently renamed PSIS, the Co-operative Bank became a registered bank in October 2011.  the bank has around 161,000 customers throughout New Zealand. 

As a co-operative the Bank is owned by its customers and its main purpose is to benefit the customers.   The Cooperative Bank paid $2.1 million of surplus profit back to its customers.  Since 2013 it has paid back over $12 million to its members.

History
 1928: Founded as the Public Service Investment Society, lending money to public servants when others were reluctant to do so
 1979: Placed in statutory management on 28 June
 1987: Statutory management ended in October
 1993: Registered under Companies Act 1993
 1996: Registered under Co-operative Companies Act 1996
 1998: Name abbreviated to PSIS
 2002: CEO John Price resigns
 2003: Girol Karacaoglu appointed CEO
 2006: Total assets surpassed NZ$1 billion in May
 2011 
June: PSIS announces dividend will be paid
October: Change of name to The Co-operative Bank and registration as a bank by the Reserve Bank of New Zealand
 2012 
January: Girol Karacaoglu resigns and Sir David Gascoigne (chairman) retires.
April: Steven Fyfe appointed chairman.
June: Bruce McLachlan appointed CEO.
 2014: Frans Kruger and Bruce McLachlan (CEO) open the branch in Queen Street, Auckland, on 17 November, with Frans Kruger becoming its first Branch Manager.
 2017: Bruce McLachlan (CEO) resigns, CFO Gareth Fleming appointed acting CEO.
May: David Cunningham appointed CEO.

Organisational memberships
 Cooperative Business New Zealand (Inc)
 New Zealand Financial Services Federation (Inc)
 New Zealand Savings Institutions Association

References

External links
The Cooperative Bank
Cooperative Business New Zealand

Banks of New Zealand
Banks established in 1928
Financial services companies of New Zealand
Companies based in Wellington
New Zealand companies established in 1928